Viștea is a commune in Brașov County, Transylvania, Romania. It is composed of five villages: Olteț (Besimbák), Rucăr (Rukkor), Viștea de Jos (the commune center), Viștea de Sus (Felsővist) and Viștișoara (Kisvist). It also included Drăguș village until 2004, when it was split off to form a separate commune.

At the 2011 census, 87.8% of inhabitants were Romanians and 12% Roma.

The commune is located at the western edge of Brașov County, in the central part of the Țara Făgărașului region, at the foot of the Făgăraș Mountains.

Viștea is traversed east to west by the Olt River, which passes  through the villages of Viștea de Jos, Olteț, and Rucăr. The Viștea River is formed by two tributaries, Viștea Mare and Viștișoara;  it crosses the villages of Viștișoara and Viștea de Sus and discharges into the Olt in Viștea de Jos. The Viștea hydropower plant (14.2 MW) is located on the Olt; it produces electricity and regulates the course of the river.

References

Communes in Brașov County
Localities in Transylvania